James Scott "Jimmy" Diaz (born November 17, 1968) is a windsurfer who represented the United States Virgin Islands. He competed in the men's Lechner A-390 event at the 1992 Summer Olympics.

Diaz married Turkish surfer Çağla Kubat on 21 September 2013.

References

External links
 
 

1968 births
Living people
United States Virgin Islands male sailors (sport)
Olympic sailors of the United States Virgin Islands
Sailors at the 1992 Summer Olympics – Lechner A-390
Place of birth missing (living people)